Southern Cal may refer to:

 Southern California an area that generally comprises California's southernmost counties
 University of Southern California, colloquially "Southern Cal"
 Southern Cal Trojans, athletic program and team name